Sir Francis Nathaniel Pierpoint Burton (26 December 1766 – 27 January 1832) was a British colonial administrator in Lower Canada and Irish politician.

Burton was the younger of twin sons born to Francis Conyngham, 2nd Baron Conyngham (born Burton), and his wife Elizabeth, daughter of Nathaniel Clements, in London. Henry Conyngham, 1st Marquess Conyngham, was his elder twin brother. In 1781, his father changed his surname to Conyngham upon the death of his maternal uncle, the Earl Conyngham, upon inheriting the Conyngham barony upon special remainder.

Burton sat as Member of Parliament (MP) in the Irish House of Commons for Killybegs in 1790 and 1798 and Clare from 1790 to the Act of Union in 1801. He sat then for Clare in the Parliament of the United Kingdom from 1801 to 1808. He also held the rank of colonel in the militia.

Burton was appointed Lieutenant-Governor of Lower Canada on 29 November 1808, but did not travel to Lower Canada until 1822, under threat of removal of his salary. During the absence of Governor George Ramsay, Burton acted as administrator of Lower Canada from 7 June 1824 – September 1825. Although he left Quebec City in October 1825 on a permanent "leave of absence", he remained the official Lieutenant Governor until his death in 1832 in Bath, England.

He married the Hon. Valentina Alicia Lawless, daughter of Nicholas Lawless, 1st Baron Cloncurry and Margaret Browne, and had five children, including:

Henry Stuart Burton  (1808–1867)
Capt. William Burton (born 1809) of the Scots Fusiliers

See also
 - one of three vessels by that name

References

External links
 Biography from the National Assembly of Quebec
 Archives of Sir Francis Nathaniel Burton (Francis Nathaniel Burton fonds, R2523) are held at Library and Archives Canada

1766 births
1832 deaths
Irish MPs 1790–1797
Irish MPs 1798–1800
Lieutenant Governors of Lower Canada
Members of the Parliament of the United Kingdom for County Clare constituencies (1801–1922)
UK MPs 1801–1802
UK MPs 1802–1806
UK MPs 1806–1807
UK MPs 1807–1812
Younger sons of barons
Francis
Members of the Parliament of Ireland (pre-1801) for County Donegal constituencies
Members of the Parliament of Ireland (pre-1801) for County Clare constituencies